Anolis hyacinthogularis, the blue dewlap anole, is a species of lizard in the family Dactyloidae. The species is found in Ecuador.

References

Anoles
Endemic fauna of Ecuador
Reptiles of Ecuador
Reptiles described in 2017